Sportcomplex De Toekomst (Dutch for Sporting complex The Future) is a sporting complex in Ouder-Amstel, Netherlands, owned by AFC Ajax N.V. The complex comprises nine football fields and is located close to the Johan Cruyff Arena. Its main field has seating capacity for 2,000 people.

The facility serves as the home grounds of Ajax Women, which competes in the Eredivisie Vrouwen, the reserves team Jong Ajax, which competes in the Eerste Divisie, as well as Ajax Amateurs, which competes in the Derde Divisie.

De Toekomst also serves as the training grounds for the first team of Ajax as well as for the Ajax Youth Academy; A-juniors (A1, A2), B-juniors (B1, B2), C-juniors (C1, C2), D-pupils (D1, D2, D3), E-pupils (E1, E2, E3) and the F-pupils (F1, F2, F3). It also serves as the home of the Future Cup, an International tournament for under-17 youth teams, which was named after the sport park.

History
In 1991 it was decided that the former De Meer Stadion of Ajax, situated in Watergraafsmeer would be replaced by the new Amsterdam ArenA, which in turn called for new training grounds for both the amateur and youth teams of the club. Sportpark Voorland, situated behind the old stadium was considered too small, and was to be demolished to make room for housing.

Originally Ajax had intended to establish their facilities at Sportpark Strandvliet on the Zwartelaantje, while the tenants present SV Amstelland refused to relocate at the time. This eventually led to Ajax shifting their focus to Sportpark De Toekomst in Ouder-Amstel. The previous tenants were willing to vacate the premises and the new stadium was built and opened in 1996.

Design
The Sport park was designed by René van Zuuk. It comprises five grass football pitches, two artificial turf pitches, a covered grandstand with 1250 seats, and bleachers along with a club house seating 250.  Since the reserves team Jong Ajax (Ajax 2), have competed in the Eerste Divisie since the 2013–14 season, which saw the expansion of an additional 800 seats on the main stand, and an additional 100 seats for the supporters of the visiting team.

The main stand has a bent canopy hanging off two leaning pillars. Van Zuik received the National Steel Price, in the category of "characteristic steel components". Since 6 June 2009, the main stands at De Toekomst are named after the deceased Bobby Haarms, a former coach and honorary member of the club.

The letters ajax, visible on the training sites main grandstand, were previously mounted on Ajax old grounds at De Meer Stadion.

See also

Teams
AFC Ajax
 AFC Ajax (amateurs)
 AFC Ajax (women)
 Jong Ajax
 Ajax Youth Academy

Stadia
 Het Houten Stadion 
 De Meer Stadion
 Olympic Stadium (Amsterdam)
 Johan Cruijff Arena

Bibliography
 Nederlands Architectuurinstituut, Architectuur in Nederland - Jaarboek 1996-1997, NAi Uitgevers, Rotterdam, 1997, 
 David Endt, Het officiële Ajax jaarboek 1996-1997, Luitingh-Sijthoff, Amsterdam, 1997, 
 Evert Vermeer and Marcel van Hoof, Ajax 100 jaar - jubileumboek 1900-2000, Luitingh-Sijthoff, Amsterdam, 2000,

References

External links
 Sportpark De Toekomst on www.ajax.nl

Sports venues in North Holland
Football venues in the Netherlands
AFC Ajax facilities
Jong Ajax
AFC Ajax (women)
Sport in Ouder-Amstel